Rhinopetitia is a genus of characins endemic to Brazil.

Species
There are currently 2 recognized species in this genus:
 Rhinopetitia myersi Géry, 1964
 Rhinopetitia potamorhachia Netto-Ferreira, Birindelli, L. M. Sousa & Menezes, 2014

References

Characidae
Fish of South America
Fish of Brazil
Endemic fauna of Brazil